The Baitul Huda (House of Guidance) in Usingen is a mosque in Germany run by the Ahmadiyya Muslim Community (AMJ) and was inaugurated on September 7, 2004, by Mirza Masroor Ahmad.

Its two prayer rooms are 77 m2 each; the community in Usingen has 160 members.

The mosque was partially burned in the morning of December 23, 2004.  Many residents in Usingen made donations for the reconstruction of the mosque; after the reconstruction, a tree in the entrance was planted as a sign of friendship.  The incendiarism never was clarified.

See also 
 Islam in Germany
 Ahmadiyya
 Baitul Huda (disambiguation)
 List of mosques in Europe

Ahmadiyya mosques in Germany
Buildings and structures in Hochtaunuskreis
Mosques completed in 2004